The 2016 Advantage Cars Prague Open ,  also known as Advantage Cars Prague Open by Zenova for sponsorship reasons, was a professional tennis tournament played on outdoor clay courts. It was the 23rd edition, for men, and 12th edition, for women, of the tournament and part of the 2016 ATP Challenger Tour and the 2016 ITF Women's Circuit, offering totals of €42,500, for men, and $50,000, for women, in prize money. It took place in Prague, Czech Republic, on 25–31 July 2016.

Men's singles main draw entrants

Seeds 

 1 Rankings as of 18 July 2016.

Other entrants 
The following player received a wildcard into the singles main draw:
  Martin Kližan
  Václav Šafránek
  David Šimůnek
  Lukáš Vejvara

The following players received entry from the qualifying draw:
  Hubert Hurkacz
  Vadym Ursu
  Matěj Vocel
  Igor Zelenay

Women's singles main draw entrants

Seeds 

 1 Rankings as of 18 July 2016.

Other entrants 
The following player received a wildcard into the singles main draw:
  Simona Heinová
  Andrea Hlaváčková
  Karolína Muchová
  Katarzyna Piter

The following players received entry from the qualifying draw:
  Ekaterina Alexandrova
  Anastasiya Komardina
  Antonia Lottner
  Rebecca Šramková

The following player received entry by a lucky loser spot:
  Martina Di Giuseppe

Champions

Men's singles

 Santiago Giraldo def.  Uladzimir Ignatik, 6–4, 3–6, 7–6(7–2)

Women's singles

 Antonia Lottner def.  Carina Witthöft, 7–6(8–6), 1–6, 7–5

Men's doubles

 Julian Knowle /  Igor Zelenay def.  Facundo Argüello /  Julio Peralta, 6–4, 7–5

Women's doubles

 Demi Schuurs /  Renata Voráčová def.  Sílvia Soler Espinosa /  Sara Sorribes Tormo, 7–5, 3–6, [10–4]

External links 
 2016 Advantage Cars Prague Open at ITFtennis.com
  

2016 ITF Women's Circuit
2016 ATP Challenger Tour
2016 in Czech tennis
2016